Sufian bin Haji Suhaimi (born 3 May 1992) is a Malaysian singer known for his singles, "Terakhir" ("The Last") "Di Matamu" ("In Your Eyes") and "Mencuba" ("Trying").

His singles, "Terakhir" and  "Di Matamu" were shortlisted for the Anugerah Juara Lagu, respectively in (AJL31) and (AJL33). Both songs were composed by himself and two friends, Sirkhan and Rinkarnaen.

Early life
His talent in singing developed since he was young and he started to play guitar in secondary school. During his studies in Universiti Sultan Zainal Abidin (UniSZA), he was actively involved in music and joined a musical band, De’ Mahameru. Sufian was an English teacher based in Johor Bahru before venturing into singing professionally.

He holds a Bachelor's degree in English from the Universiti Sultan Zainal Abidin and a master's degree in Mass communication from the Universiti Teknologi MARA, Shah Alam.

Career

2016: "Terakhir" and breakthrough
"Terakhir" was composed by Sirkhan since 2012. Sufian, Sirkhan and Rinkarnaen took more than two years to complete the song. The rough cut of the song was recorded equipment he bought with his savings and later uploaded to SoundCloud by Sufian. A fan uploaded the song on YouTube and the song started to gain attention from fans. Few music labels contacted Sufian to sign him as a singer, yet he turned the offers down citing his conflict due to his affinity with rock music. Discussion with Sirkhan led to his decision to accept offer from music label and Sufian was signed with Aries Music in early 2016. "Terakhir" was re-recorded and released on iTunes in March 2016. The single received nationwide success and was shortlisted for Anugerah Juara Lagu. Sufian's second single, "Harus Aku" was released in October 2016.

2017–2018: Follow-up singles, Di Matamu and venture into Indonesian market
In August 2017, his third single, "Terasa Ada" was released and was inspired by Sufian's high-profile relationship with actress, Elfira Loy.

Following the break-up with Elfira Loy, Sufian released "Di Matamu" as his fourth single in March 2018. The single became a commercial success, gaining more than 20 million views on YouTube within two months. "Di Matamu" also peaked atop the RIM International & Domestic Charts for a week and became the most streamed domestic songs for eleven weeks. In January 2019, the official music video for "Di Matamu" became the most viewed Malaysian music video on YouTube after gaining more than 50 million views.

Following the success of "Di Matamu", Sufian re-recorded the song with Indonesian group, Shima for the Indonesian market. The song was re-recorded with new music arrangement and renamed "Di Matamu 2.0". A new video for "Di Matamu 2.0" was shot in Indonesia and released on 23 November 2018.

In its annual look back in music, Spotify reveals that Sufian was ranked second on the list of most streamed Malaysian artistes of 2018.

2019–present: "Mencuba", poetry book and TRIO Concert
In April 2019, Sufian released the single, "Mencuba". The music video for the single gained more than 1 million views on YouTube in three days as well as trending at number 2 on the video-sharing website. Sufian also announced his plans to release a poetry book, written since his days as a student in UniSZA, by the end of the year. The book will be published by Universiti Utara Malaysia.

Sufian, alongside Khai Bahar and Wany Hasrita, held the "TRIO Concert 2019" at Malawati Stadium, Selangor on 2 November 2019.

Personal life
In October 2017, Sufian announced his engagement with actress, Elfira Loy. The couple was set to wed on 23 March 2018. However, the engagement was called off on 17 February 2018.

Discography

Singles

As lead artist

As featured artist

Concerts and tours

Malaysia
2019: TRIO Concert 2019 (with Khai Bahar and Wany Hasrita), Malawati Stadium, Shah Alam, Selangor

Filmography

Television

Awards and achievements

References

21st-century Malaysian male singers
Living people
1992 births
People from Johor
Malaysian male singer-songwriters
Malay-language singers
Malaysian people of Malay descent
Malaysian Muslims